Ben Nicholas Harrison (born 2 March 1997) is an English professional footballer who plays for Raynes Park Vale.

Playing career
Having played for AFC Wimbledon since age ten, Harrison made his debut for AFC Wimbledon on 2 September 2014, coming on for Callum Kennedy at half-time during a Football League Trophy victory over Southend United at Kingsmeadow. He made his Football league debut on 13 September 2014, playing the full game at Accrington Stanley which ended in a 1–0 defeat for the "Dons". Harrison signed his first professional contract with AFC Wimbledon on 26 September 2014. In January 2016, Harrison joined Isthmian League Premier Division side Tonbridge Angels on a month's loan. In June 2016 Harrison was released by AFC Wimbledon.

Harrison joined Merstham in June 2017. Two years later, he joined Kingstonian. In May 2021, following loan spells at East Grinstead Town, Kingstonian announced Harrison's departure from the club, due to "personal reasons".

During the 2021–22 season, Harrison joined Raynes Park Vale.

Statistics

References

External links

Living people
English footballers
Association football defenders
AFC Wimbledon players
Merstham F.C. players
Kingstonian F.C. players
East Grinstead Town F.C. players
Raynes Park Vale F.C. players
People from Richmond, London
Footballers from the London Borough of Richmond upon Thames
English Football League players
1997 births